These 179 species belong to Dendrolaelaps, a genus of mites in the family Digamasellidae.

Dendrolaelaps species

 Dendrolaelaps aberratus Hirschmann & Wisniewski, 1984
 Dendrolaelaps abietis Hirschmann, 1960
 Dendrolaelaps acornutosimilis Hirschmann, 1960
 Dendrolaelaps acornutus Hirschmann, 1960
 Dendrolaelaps adelaideae Womersley, 1954
 Dendrolaelaps aegypticus Metwally & Mersal, 1985
 Dendrolaelaps apophyseosimilis Hirschmann, 1960
 Dendrolaelaps apophyseus Hirschmann, 1960
 Dendrolaelaps arenarioides Hirschmann & Wisniewski, 1982
 Dendrolaelaps arenarius Karg, 1971
 Dendrolaelaps arvicolus (Leitner, 1949)
 Dendrolaelaps australicornutus Hirschmann, 1972
 Dendrolaelaps baixuelii Ma, 1997
 Dendrolaelaps balazyi Hirschmann & Wisniewski, 1982
 Dendrolaelaps bengalensis Pramanik & Raychaudhuri, 1978
 Dendrolaelaps bhattacharyyai Hirschmann, 1974
 Dendrolaelaps bidentatus Van Daele, 1977
 Dendrolaelaps bisetus (Berlese, 1891)
 Dendrolaelaps brasiliensis Wisniewski & Hirschmann, 1984
 Dendrolaelaps brevipilis (Leitner, 1949)
 Dendrolaelaps brevipiloides Hirschmann & Wisniewski, 1982
 Dendrolaelaps camponoti Wisniewski & Hirschmann, 1983
 Dendrolaelaps capensis (Berlese, 1920)
 Dendrolaelaps carolinensis McGraw & Farrier, 1969
 Dendrolaelaps casualis Huhta & Karg, 2010
 Dendrolaelaps coleopterophilus (Hirschmann, 1954)
 Dendrolaelaps comatus Hirschmann, 1960
 Dendrolaelaps cornutodaelei Hirschmann & Wisniewski, 1982
 Dendrolaelaps cornutohirschmanni Wisniewski, 1979
 Dendrolaelaps cornutulus Hirschmann, 1960
 Dendrolaelaps cornutus (Kramer, 1886)
 Dendrolaelaps crassipes (Schweizer, 1961)
 Dendrolaelaps crassitarsalis (Willmann, 1951)
 Dendrolaelaps cubae Wisniewski & Hirschmann, 1993
 Dendrolaelaps cylindricus (Berlese, 1918)
 Dendrolaelaps debilipes (Berlese, 1920)
 Dendrolaelaps disetosimilis Hirschmann, 1960
 Dendrolaelaps disetus (Hirschmann, 1954)
 Dendrolaelaps doljensis Wisniewski & Hirschmann, 1991
 Dendrolaelaps duplodens Wisniewski & Hirschmann, 1991
 Dendrolaelaps eichhorni Wisniewski, 1980
 Dendrolaelaps elaterophilus (Hirschmann, 1954)
 Dendrolaelaps fageticola (Schmölzer, 1995)
 Dendrolaelaps fallacoides Hirschmann & Wisniewski, 1982
 Dendrolaelaps fallax (Leitner, 1949)
 Dendrolaelaps forcipiformis Hirschmann, 1960
 Dendrolaelaps formicarius (Huhta & Karg, 2010)
 Dendrolaelaps fossilis Hirschmann, 1971
 Dendrolaelaps foveolatosimilis Hirschmann, 1960
 Dendrolaelaps foveolatus (Leitner, 1949)
 Dendrolaelaps frenzeli (Willmann, 1936)
 Dendrolaelaps fukikoae Ishikawa, 1977
 Dendrolaelaps glareoli Wisniewski & Hirschmann, 1984
 Dendrolaelaps halaskovae Schmölzer, 1995
 Dendrolaelaps halophilus (Willmann, 1951)
 Dendrolaelaps heterotrichus Hirschmann, 1960
 Dendrolaelaps hunteri Wisniewski, 1979
 Dendrolaelaps hurlbutti Hirschmann & Wisniewski, 1982
 Dendrolaelaps imitopraetarsalis Ma & Lin, 2005
 Dendrolaelaps insignis Hirschmann, 1960
 Dendrolaelaps isochetus Shcherbak & Bregetova, 1980
 Dendrolaelaps krantzi Wisniewski, 1979
 Dendrolaelaps laetus Shcherbak, 1980
 Dendrolaelaps langi Hirschmann & Wisniewski, 1984
 Dendrolaelaps lasiophilus Hirschmann, 1960
 Dendrolaelaps latior (Leitner, 1949)
 Dendrolaelaps latioroides Hirschmann & Wisniewski, 1982
 Dendrolaelaps latoides Hirschmann & Wisniewski, 1982
 Dendrolaelaps latus Hirschmann, 1960
 Dendrolaelaps lemani (Schweizer, 1961)
 Dendrolaelaps lindquisti Wisniewski, 1979
 Dendrolaelaps liujingyuani Ma, 2008
 Dendrolaelaps longiductus Wisniewski & Hirschmann, 1993
 Dendrolaelaps longifallax Hirschmann, 1960
 Dendrolaelaps longiusculus (Leitner, 1949)
 Dendrolaelaps louisianae Hirschmann & Wisniewski, 1982
 Dendrolaelaps lusikisikiae Hirschmann & Wisniewski, 1984
 Dendrolaelaps luxtoni Wisniewski & Hirschmann, 1989
 Dendrolaelaps macfarlanei (Ryke, 1962)
 Dendrolaelaps magnus Wisniewski & Hirschmann, 1993
 Dendrolaelaps majesticus Wisniewski & Hirschmann, 1989
 Dendrolaelaps markewitschi Shcherbak, 1980
 Dendrolaelaps marylandae (Hurlbutt, 1967)
 Dendrolaelaps medius Shcherbak, 1980
 Dendrolaelaps metwallyi El-Halawany & Abdel-Samad, 1991
 Dendrolaelaps modestus Barilo, 1989
 Dendrolaelaps monodentatus Wisniewski & Hirschmann, 1989
 Dendrolaelaps monoufiensis Sweelam & Nasreldin, 2017
 Dendrolaelaps moseri (Hurlbutt, 1967)
 Dendrolaelaps moserisimilis Shcherbak, 1984
 Dendrolaelaps myiaphilus (Karg, 2002)
 Dendrolaelaps myrmecophilus Hirschmann, 1960
 Dendrolaelaps natans (Pintchuk, 1972)
 Dendrolaelaps neocornutus (Hurlbutt, 1967)
 Dendrolaelaps neodisetosimilis McGraw & Farrier, 1969
 Dendrolaelaps neodisetus (Hurlbutt, 1967)
 Dendrolaelaps neozwoelferi Hirschmann, 1983
 Dendrolaelaps nikolai Shcherbak, 1978
 Dendrolaelaps ningxiaensis Ma & Bai, 2009
 Dendrolaelaps nostricornutus Hirschmann & Wisniewski, 1982
 Dendrolaelaps oblitus Hirschmann & Wisniewski, 1982
 Dendrolaelaps oligochetus Shcherbak, 1980
 Dendrolaelaps ophidiotrichus Luxton, 1982
 Dendrolaelaps opticus Barilo, 1989
 Dendrolaelaps oudemansi Halbert, 1915
 Dendrolaelaps oudemansiformis Hirschmann & Wisniewski, 1982
 Dendrolaelaps papuae Hirschmann & Wisniewski, 1982
 Dendrolaelaps paradoxa Shcherbak, 1982
 Dendrolaelaps passalorum (Pearse & Wharton, 1936)
 Dendrolaelaps peruensis Wisniewski & Hirschmann, 1989
 Dendrolaelaps piriformis Hirschmann & Wisniewski, 1982
 Dendrolaelaps populi Hirschmann, 1960
 Dendrolaelaps populoides Hirschmann & Wisniewski, 1982
 Dendrolaelaps posnaniensis Wisniewski & Hirschmann, 1984
 Dendrolaelaps praetarsalis Wisniewski & Hirschmann, 1985
 Dendrolaelaps presepum (Berlese, 1918)
 Dendrolaelaps procornutoides Hirschmann & Wisniewski, 1982
 Dendrolaelaps procornutus Hirschmann, 1960
 Dendrolaelaps proprius Shcherbak, 1985
 Dendrolaelaps proteae (Ryke, 1962)
 Dendrolaelaps punctatosimilis Hirschmann, 1960
 Dendrolaelaps punctatulus Hirschmann, 1960
 Dendrolaelaps punctatus (Hirschmann, 1954)
 Dendrolaelaps puntperivi (Schweizer, 1961)
 Dendrolaelaps quadricrinus (Berlese, 1920)
 Dendrolaelaps quadripilus (Berlese, 1920)
 Dendrolaelaps quadritorus (Robillard, 1971)
 Dendrolaelaps rackae Hirschmann & Wisniewski, 1982
 Dendrolaelaps rasmii Nasr & Mersal, 1986
 Dendrolaelaps rectus Karg, 1962
 Dendrolaelaps remotus Karg, 1977
 Dendrolaelaps reticulatus (Berlese, 1920)
 Dendrolaelaps reticulosus Hirschmann, 1960
 Dendrolaelaps rotoni (Hurlbutt, 1967)
 Dendrolaelaps rotundus Hirschmann, 1960
 Dendrolaelaps ruhmi Hirschmann, 1972
 Dendrolaelaps rykei Hirschmann, 1974
 Dendrolaelaps samsinaki Hirschmann & Wisniewski, 1982
 Dendrolaelaps saprophilus Huhta, 1982
 Dendrolaelaps schauenburgi (Schweizer, 1961)
 Dendrolaelaps schweizeri Hirschmann, 1960
 Dendrolaelaps sellnicki Hirschmann, 1960
 Dendrolaelaps sellnickiformis Hirschmann & Wisniewski, 1982
 Dendrolaelaps septentrionalis (Sellnick, 1958)
 Dendrolaelaps serratus Hirschmann, 1960
 Dendrolaelaps shcherbakaecornutus Hirschmann & Wisniewski, 1982
 Dendrolaelaps shennongjiaensis Ma & Liu, 2003
 Dendrolaelaps sibiriae Wisniewski & Michalski, 1983
 Dendrolaelaps simplicis Wisniewski & Hirschmann, 1991
 Dendrolaelaps sinodendronis Wisniewski & Hirschmann, 1989
 Dendrolaelaps sitalaensis (Bhattacharyya, 1978)
 Dendrolaelaps songshanensis Ma & Lin, 2005
 Dendrolaelaps stammeri Hirschmann, 1960
 Dendrolaelaps stammeriformis Hirschmann & Wisniewski, 1982
 Dendrolaelaps stanislavi Wisniewski & Hirschmann, 1993
 Dendrolaelaps strenzkei Hirschmann, 1960
 Dendrolaelaps tauricus Shcherbak, 1983
 Dendrolaelaps tenuipiloides Hirschmann & Wisniewski, 1982
 Dendrolaelaps tenuipilus Hirschmann, 1960
 Dendrolaelaps transkeiensis Hirschmann & Wisniewski, 1984
 Dendrolaelaps transportabilis Wisniewski & Hirschmann, 1993
 Dendrolaelaps transvaalensis (Ryke, 1962)
 Dendrolaelaps trapezoides Hirschmann, 1960
 Dendrolaelaps tritrichus Hirschmann, 1960
 Dendrolaelaps tuberosus Hirschmann, 1960
 Dendrolaelaps tumulus Luxton, 1982
 Dendrolaelaps uncinatus Hirschmann, 1960
 Dendrolaelaps undulatus Hirschmann, 1960
 Dendrolaelaps validulus (Berlese, 1920)
 Dendrolaelaps varipunctatus (Hurlbutt, 1967)
 Dendrolaelaps vermicularis Ma, 2001
 Dendrolaelaps viator (Vitzthum, 1921)
 Dendrolaelaps vitzthumicornutus Hirschmann & Wisniewski, 1982
 Dendrolaelaps wangfengzheni Ma, 1995
 Dendrolaelaps wengrisae Wisniewski, 1979
 Dendrolaelaps willmanni Hirschmann, 1960
 Dendrolaelaps xylophilus Wisniewski & Hirschmann, 1993
 Dendrolaelaps zaheri Metwally & Mersal, 1985
 Dendrolaelaps zwoelferi Hirschmann, 1960

References